Mario Tchou (1924–1961), was an Italian engineer, of Chinese descent, a pioneer of computer science in Italy. Mario Tchou was an engineer who led a group of scientists from the University of Pisa to invent, in 1959, the Olivetti Elea, world most powerful computer at the time. He was also a professor at Columbia University. Tchou earned his bachelor’s degree in electrical engineering from the Catholic University of America in 1947. He graduated from the New York University Polytechnic School of Engineering in 1949.

After the separation form his first wife, he married the artist Elisa Montessori in 1955, and they had two daughters.

He died at the age of 37 during a car accident between Turin and Milan. His wife and a large number of colleagues placed the death of Mario Tchou within a wider plan aimed to eliminating Olivetti from the international computer's scene. Soon after his death, Olivetti sold its computer division to General Electric.

References

External links

It.wikipedia.org

Polytechnic Institute of New York University alumni
Italian engineers
Italian people of Chinese descent
Columbia University faculty
20th-century Italian inventors